This is a list of regencies and cities in South Sumatra province. As of October 2019, there were 13 regencies and 4 cities.

External links 

 
 
Regencies, Indonesia
Regencies and cities